Robert Miller Montague (August 7, 1899 – February 20, 1958) was a lieutenant general in the United States Army.  He achieved prominence as the deputy commander of Fort Bliss, Texas, and commander of the Sandia Missile Base in New Mexico during the start of modern ufology and head of the U.S. Caribbean Command.

Early life

Montague was born in Portland, Oregon, on August 7, 1899.  He attended the University of Oregon and then transferred to the United States Military Academy at West Point, from which he graduated in 1918 with a commission as a second lieutenant of artillery.

World War I
Having graduated in November during a wartime expansion of the West Point student body, Montague began his career too late for active combat in World War I.  As many other students from his class did, Montague carried out a European observation tour for most of 1919, enhancing his professional knowledge by visiting battlefields in France, Belgium, and Germany, compiling after action reports, and interviewing battlefield veterans.

Post World War I
Montague completed the Field Artillery Basic Course in 1920.

He then carried out numerous assignments throughout the United States, including serving as an instructor at the United States Military Academy in the 1930s.

In 1933 Montague graduated from the Field Artillery Advanced Course.

Montague completed the Command and General Staff College in 1938.

World War II
From 1944 to 1945 Montague was commander of the 83rd Infantry Division Artillery in the European Theater of Operations.  He also served as acting division commander on several occasions.

Post World War II
From 1945 to 1947 Montague served as deputy commander of the Army’s Air Defense Artillery Center at Fort Bliss, Texas.

From 1947 to 1951 Montague was the commander of the Sandia Missile Base near Albuquerque, New Mexico.

Montague served as the head of plans, operations and training, G-3, for the United States European Command from 1951 to 1952.

From 1952 to 1955 Montague was assigned as deputy commander of Army Field Forces, based at Fort Monroe, Virginia.

Montague commanded the U.S. I Corps in South Korea from 1955 to 1957.

Connection to UFO studies
As deputy commander of Fort Bliss with supposed jurisdiction over the White Sands Missile Range at the time of the Roswell Incident, and later as commander of the Sandia Base, Montague is presumed by many UFO researchers to have been made aware of an alleged spacecraft crash near Roswell, New Mexico or to have had a hand in covering up evidence of the alleged crash, and his name routinely appears in UFO magazines, books and other media.

Commander, U.S. Caribbean Command
In 1957 Montague was appointed to command the U.S. Caribbean Defense Command, the post he was still serving in when he died.

Death
General Montague was stricken with an intestinal illness in January, 1958 after traveling extensively in South America.  He did not recover, and died on February 20 from a cerebral hemorrhage at Gorgas Hospital, Balboa, Panama Canal Zone.

Robert M. Montague is buried at Arlington National Cemetery, Section 30, Site 533 RH.

Awards and decorations
General Montague received the Distinguished Service Medal, the Legion of Merit and two awards of the Bronze Star.

Memorials
Montague Road at Fort Sill is named for him as is Montague Loop at Fort Bliss.

Personal
Robert Miller Montague was the father of Brigadier General Robert M. Montague, Jr., (October 22, 1924 – October 15, 1996), who graduated from West Point in 1947 and was one of the early U.S. strategists of the Vietnam War.  After retiring from the Army the younger Montague served as executive director of the Joseph P. Kennedy Jr. Foundation and the Special Olympics.

References

External links
Generals of World War II

1899 births
United States Army Field Artillery Branch personnel
United States Military Academy alumni
United States Army generals
United States Army personnel of World War I
United States Army Command and General Staff College alumni
Recipients of the Distinguished Service Medal (US Army)
Recipients of the Legion of Merit
Military personnel from Portland, Oregon
1958 deaths
Burials at Arlington National Cemetery
United States Army generals of World War II